Western Heights, may refer to:

 Dover Western Heights, Dover, Kent, England
 Western Heights College, Geelong, Australia
 Western Heights High School is a high school in Rotorua, New Zealand
 Western Heights High School is a public high school in Oklahoma City, Oklahoma
 Western Heights, a suburb of Auckland, New Zealand
 Western Heights, Dallas, a neighborhood in West Dallas, Texas
 Western Heights, a suburb of Hamilton, New Zealand
 Western Heights Cemetery, burial place of Clyde Barrow of Bonnie and Clyde